Mark Anthony Graham (May 17, 1973 in Gordon Town, Jamaica – September 4, 2006 in Panjwaii, Afghanistan) was a Canadian Olympic athlete and soldier who died while participating in Operation Medusa during the NATO mission in Afghanistan.

Biography
Graham grew up in Hamilton, Ontario, lived in Calgary, Alberta and had been stationed at CFB Petawawa in Ontario. He attended Chedoke Middle School and then Sir Allan MacNab Secondary School in Hamilton, then the University of Nebraska and later Kent State in Ohio on track-and-field scholarships.

Graham competed at the 1992 Summer Olympics in Barcelona as a member of the 4x400m relay. They finished fifth in their heat with a time of 3:04.69
and did not advance to the finals. He also represented Canada at the 1994 Commonwealth Games in Victoria, British Columbia.

Graham served in the 1st Battalion of The Royal Canadian Regiment of the Canadian Armed Forces.

On September 4, 2006, Graham was killed in a friendly fire incident when two USAF A-10 Thunderbolts fired on his platoon, having mistaken them for Taliban insurgents. He was awarded the Sacrifice Medal and is buried at the National Military Cemetery in Ottawa.

See also
 Canadian records in track and field

References

External links
Canadian Olympic Committee profile

1973 births
2006 deaths
Black Canadian track and field athletes
Athletes (track and field) at the 1992 Summer Olympics
Athletes (track and field) at the 1994 Commonwealth Games
Canadian military personnel killed in the War in Afghanistan (2001–2021)
Canadian male sprinters
Military personnel killed by friendly fire
Olympic track and field athletes of Canada
Commonwealth Games competitors for Canada
Athletes from Hamilton, Ontario
Jamaican emigrants to Canada
Deaths by American airstrikes
People from Saint Andrew Parish, Jamaica
Royal Canadian Regiment officers
Canadian military personnel from Ontario
Olympians killed in warfare